Kemal Bourhani (born 13 September 1981) is a former footballer who played as a striker. Born in France, he represented Comoros at international level.

Club career
Bourhani played in Ligue 1 for En Avant de Guingamp and FC Lorient and in Ligue 2 for AS Beauvais Oise and Vannes OC.

International career
Paris-born Bourhani played his first and last international match for the Comoros national football team on 28 March 2011 against Libya.

References

1981 births
Living people
Citizens of Comoros through descent
French sportspeople of Comorian descent
Footballers from Paris
Association football forwards
Comorian footballers
French footballers
Ligue 1 players
Ligue 2 players
INF Clairefontaine players
En Avant Guingamp players
FC Lorient players
Vannes OC players
AS Beauvais Oise players
AS Gabès players
Comoros international footballers